Louis H. Sturm Hardware Store is a historic commercial building located at Jasper, Dubois County, Indiana.  It was built about 1850, and is a three-story, three-bay, Italianate-style brick building.  It houses the oldest continuously operated commercial retail business in Jasper.

It was added to the National Register of Historic Places in 2003.

References

Commercial buildings on the National Register of Historic Places in Indiana
Italianate architecture in Indiana
Commercial buildings completed in 1886
Jasper, Indiana
Buildings and structures in Dubois County, Indiana
National Register of Historic Places in Dubois County, Indiana